Court House, also known as Courthouse, is a transit-oriented neighborhood in Arlington County, Virginia. It is centered around the Court House station on the Orange Line and the Silver Line of the Washington Metro.

Although Arlington is so geographically small that it does not have component towns or cities, the Courthouse neighborhood is sometimes referred to as county seat, as it is home to the primary county government administrative complex as well as a justice center consisting of a jail, courthouse and police HQ. Indeed, the neighborhood gets its name from the governmental uses that call it home. 

The neighborhood consists of high-rise residential and business buildings including offices of PAE and an 8-screen AMC movie theater.  It is home to more than 25 bars and restaurants, ranging from informal lunch take-out spots, to a venue for local bands, to upscale Latin and Thai evening establishments. 

Courthouse also features one of the first garden-style apartments complexes built in the United States.  Built in the 1930s,  Colonial Village consists of private condos, co-op housing, and apartments for rent and is listed on the National Register of Historic Places.

Fort Woodbury once stood near the site of the current Arlington County Courthouse (14th St. N. at N. Courthouse Rd.), atop one of the highest hills in Arlington.  It was part of the "Arlington Line" of fortifications built after the Union seized the area in May 1861, at the beginning of the Civil War.  The fort was named for Major D.P. Woodbury, the engineer who designed and constructed the Arlington Line.  Woodbury Heights, a high-rise condominium that sits on the Fort Woodbury site, was constructed in the 1980s and is named in honor of the fort.

As with many neighborhoods in central Arlington, the exact boundaries of the Courthouse neighborhood are unclear.  Arlington County's Court House Sector Plan includes the area bounded by Wilson Boulevard, Cleveland Street, Fairfax Drive, Arlington Boulevard and Courthouse Road.  The Clarendon-Courthouse Civic Association has similar boundaries.  However, an argument can be made to extend the Courthouse neighborhood to lie between the midpoint of the locations of the Court House and Clarendon Metro stations and the midpoint of the Court House and Rosslyn Stations -- which would be Danville and Rhodes Streets, respectively.

References

External links 
 Court House Metro Station Area Data, Statistics and Development
 Arlington's Urban Villages - Courthouse

Neighborhoods in Arlington County, Virginia
Transit-oriented developments in the United States